Nirmala Higher Secondary School may refer to:

 Nirmala Higher Secondary School, Chemperi, Kerala, India
 Nirmala Higher Secondary School, Muvattupuzha, Kerala, India

See also
 Nirmala High School (disambiguation)